The University of Basra ( Jāmi'at Al Basrah) is situated in the city of Basra, Iraq. For historic reasons the final -h is retained on Basrah in the name of the university.

Founded in 1964 to meet the needs of southern Iraq, the University of Basrah was at first affiliated with the University of Baghdad, but in 1964 it became an independent body. Today the University consists of fourteen colleges located on three campuses around the city of Basra, with research facilities and student halls of residence (dormitories).

The University awards the degrees of BA, BSc, Higher Diploma, MA, MSc and PhD.

Colleges

The university is composed of 15 colleges:

 College of Medicine
 College of Pharmacy
 College of Dentistry
 College of Veterinary Medicine
 College of Nursing
 College of Engineering
 College of Science
 College of Agriculture
 College of Education
 College of Business and Economics
 College of Law
 College of Arts
 College of Physical Education
 College of Education for Girls
 College of Fine Arts

Centres
The University conducts research through the following research centres:

 Iranian Studies Centre
 Marine Science Centre
 Polymer Studies Centre
 Arabian Gulf Studies Centre
 Basrah Studies Centre
 Date Palm Research Centre
 Educational Counselling Centre
 Resources Centre
 Teaching Methods Development  Centre
 Living Languages Centre
 Computer Centre
 Continuing Educational Centre

There is also the Desalination Unit (affiliated with the College of Engineering), the Natural History Museum, the Haemoglobinopathy Unit, the Internet Resources Centre, the Central Library, and a Publishing house.

Campuses
The University of Basrah consists of three campuses, they are as follows:
 Northern Campus of Qarmat Ali contains the colleges of Pharmacy, Veterinary Medicine, Engineering, Science, Education, Agriculture and Physical Education.
 Southern Campus of Bab Al Zubayer contains the colleges of Business and Economics, Law, Arts, Historical Studies, Fine Arts.
 College of Medicine Campus contains the College of Medicine and the Teaching Hospital.
 College of Dentistry Campus contains the College of Dentistry.

Presidents
 Dr. Abdel Hadi Mahbooba (01/04/1964 to 24/10/1968)
 Dr. Sadeq Al-Khayyat (from 25/10/1968 to 03/10/1969)
 Dr. Saad Abdul Baqi Al Rawi(from 04/10/1969 to 31/12/1969)
 Dr. Khalil Hamid Al Talib(from 01/01/1970 to 04/04/1970)
 Dr. Nizar Nadheef Al-Shawi (from 05/04/1970 to 05/09/1975)
 Dr. Yousef Abdul Illah Khashab (from 05/09/1975 to 05/12/1984)
 Dr. Majeed Mohammed Saeed (from 06/12/1984 to 21/03/1985)
 Dr. Dakhil Hassan Jrew (from 21/03/1985 to 05/02/1993)
 Dr. Akram Mohammed Sobhi (from 06/02/1993 to 30/08/2001)
 Dr. Mohammed Abdul Al Al Nuaimi (from 01/09/2001 to 09/04/2003)
 Dr. Salman Dawood Salman (from 01/05/2003 to 11/09/2005)
 Dr. As'ad Saleem Abdulqadir (from 01/07/2004 to 1/09/2004)
 Dr. Ali Abbass Alwan (from 11/09/2005 to 29/10/2009)
 Dr. Salih Ismail Najim (from 01/11/2009 until 26/6/2012)
 Prof. Thamer Ahmad Hamdan Al-Tamimi (from 27/6/2012)
 Prof. Dr. Saad Shaheen Hamadi (from 1/7/2019 until now)

External links
 University of Basrah website 
 UMS University Management System

 
Educational institutions established in 1964
1964 establishments in Iraq